Government First Grade College, Vijayanagar, is a general degree college located at Vijayanagar, Bangalore, Karnataka. It is established in the year 1985. The college is affiliated with Bangalore University. This college offers different courses in arts, science and commerce.

Departments

Science
Physics
Chemistry
Mathematics
Botany
Zoology
Computer Science

Arts and Commerce
Kannada
English
History
Political Science
Sociology
Economics
Journalism and Mass communication 
Business Administration
Commerce
Psychology
 Geography

Accreditation
The college is  recognized by the University Grants Commission (UGC).

References

External links
http://gfgc.kar.nic.in/vijayanagar/

Educational institutions established in 1985
1985 establishments in Karnataka
Colleges affiliated to Bangalore University
Colleges in Bangalore
Vijayanagar